The Abruzzo regional election of 2008 took place on 14–15 December 2008, due to the early resignation of President Ottaviano Del Turco, after his indictment for alleged corruption. The election was to take place on 30 November–1 December, but was postponed because of legal issues over the ammission of the list of For the Common Good.

The candidate of The People of Freedom (PdL) was Giovanni Chiodi, a former mayor of Teramo. The PdL rejected any alliance with the Union of the Centre (UDC) and The Right in order to strengthen its goal of becoming a majority force free from the blackmails of small "old politics" parties.

On the centre-left, local and national leaders of Democratic Party (PD) tried to produce a joint candidate with Italy of Values (IdV) and UDC, but IdV said that an alliance with the PD was possible only if the PD would have supported their own candidate, Carlo Constantini. IdV was even tempted by running a solitary campaign: Abruzzo was in fact a stronghold for the party, whose leader Antonio Di Pietro came from neighbouring Molise. However, in late October, the PD agreed to support Costantini at the head of a large centre-left coalition, comprising also the Communist Refoundation Party (PRC), the Party of Italian Communists (PdCI), the Federation of the Greens and the Socialist Party (PS).

The PD tried to woo also the UDC in the centre-left coalition, but the UDC refused any alliance with populist IdV and decided to run its own candidate, Rodolfo De Laurentiis. Teodoro Buontempo was the candidate of The Right.

On election day Gianni Chiodi defeated Carlo Costantini. The election was a major defeat for the PD, while IdV had a very good result, despite the poor showing of its candidate, who won fewer votes than its supporting parties.

Results
Source: Ministry of the Interior

References

External links
Campaign website of Gianni Chiodi
Campaign website of Carlo Costantini
Campaign website of Rodolfo De Laurentiis

Elections in Abruzzo
2008 elections in Italy
December 2008 events in Europe